Cape Town Pride is an annual gay pride event ending with a pride parade held in Cape Town, South Africa. It usually runs from around the end of February and is a week of festivals, parties and other events.

The first South African pride parade was held in Johannesburg on 13 October 1990, the first such event on the African continent. The first pride parade in Cape Town was held in 1993, and it has been held as an annual event subject to interruptions thereafter.

The parade resumed after a period in 2001 as part of a week-long Cape Town Pride event, from 10 to 17 December. The 2001 event was met with a protest organised by local Anti-abortion organisations outside the Church of the Sacred Heart in Somerset Road where a Gay Pride "Dignity and Diversity" Interfaith Service was being held.

Cape Town Pride was not held in 2003 when the event timing was moved to February.

In 2006, the event adopted the theme "Uniting Cultures of Cape Town", in 2007 "The Carnival of Love", in 2009 "Pink Ubuntu – Uniting Cultures of Cape Town", and in 2011 "Love Our Diversity".

See also
Pride parades in South Africa
List of LGBT events in South Africa

References

External links 

 

2001 establishments in South Africa
Festivals in Cape Town
Pride parades in South Africa
Recurring events established in 2001